Need is the fourth studio album by Christian rock artist Todd Agnew. It was released on October 6, 2009, through INO and Ardent records. The first radio single, "Joy Unspeakable", has peaked at No. 45 on Billboard's Hot Christian Songs chart. His website is currently offering an acoustic EP and a free digital download of "Joy Unspeakable" to those who pre-order the album, and on October 6 they would get a "Need" T-shirt, an autographed copy of "Need", and a digital download of "Need" with 4 bonus tracks.

Track listing 
 "Joy Unspeakable" (Barney E. Warren; Music/Additional lyrics: Todd Agnew) - 2:55
 "Written on the Wall" (Todd Agnew) - 3:36
 "I Need No Other" (Lyrics: Eliza Edmunds Hewitt; Music: Todd Agnew and Michael Neale) - 3:29
 "Give Me Jesus" (Lyrics: Fanny Crosby; Music: Todd Agnew) - 3:23
 "Higher Ground" (Lyrics: Johnson Oatman Jr. ;Music: Chris Collins and Todd Agnew) - 5:05
 "Tell Me The Story" (Lyrics: Fanny Crosby; Music: Todd Agnew) - 3:13
 "Did You Mean Me?" (Todd Agnew) - 3:25
 "Gloria" (Lyrics: Henry Francis Lyte; Music/Additional lyrics: Chris Collins and Todd Agnew) - 2:59
 "The Love of God" (Lyrics: Frederick Martin Lehman; Music: Todd Agnew) - 5:16
 "Breakable" (Todd Agnew) - 3:00
 "Deep Love of Jesus" (Lyrics: Samuel Trevor Francis; Music/Additional lyrics: Todd Agnew) - 3:09
 "Jesus, the Hope of Glory" (Todd Agnew) - 6:15
 "All That I Have"*
 "Way of the Cross"*
 "Glory in Your Cross"*
 "All the World"*

*Bonus tracks

Acoustic EP track listing
 "Joy Unspeakable" (acoustic)
 "Mercy in Me" (acoustic)
 "This Is All I Have to Give" (acoustic)
 "On a Corner in Memphis" (acoustic)
 "Grace Like Rain"/"My Jesus" (acoustic)

Personnel 
 Todd Agnew – lead vocals, guitar (4-7, 11), acoustic piano (5, 10)
 James Joseph – Wurlitzer electric piano (1, 5), programming (1, 3, 7, 8), acoustic piano (2, 3, 8), Hammond B3 organ (2), organ (7)
 Rick Steff – Hammond B3 organ (5, 6, 11), acoustic piano (11)
 Jamie Kenney – acoustic piano (9)
 Tim Mason – acoustic piano (12), Hammond B3 organ (12)
 Scott Hardin – guitar (1, 2, 3, 8, 10), acoustic piano (7)
 Sam Weaver – guitar (1, 2, 3, 7, 8, 10, 11)
 Charlie Shaw – guitar (4, 6, 11)
 Steve Selvidge – guitar (5, 9)
 Richard Thomas – bass (1, 2, 3, 7, 8, 10), strings (1, 8), cello (2, 7)
 Dave Smith – bass (4, 5, 6, 9, 11)
 Cody Spriggs – bass (12)
 Mike Jackson – drums (1, 2, 3, 7, 8, 10), tambourine (12)
 Kim Trammell – drums (4, 5, 6, 9, 11)
 Brian Wilson – drums (12)
 Adam Hill – tambourine (5, 11)
 Jonathan Chu – strings (1, 8)
 Anna Acosta – violin (2)
 Josh Stewart – string arrangements (2, 3)
 Grace Bridges – strings (3)
 Adrienne Christensen – strings (3)
 Cecily Richardson – strings (3)
 Hannah Schmidt – strings (3)
 JJ Heller – backing vocals (1)
 Ryan Wingo – backing vocals (1, 8)
 Myla Smith – backing vocals (4)
 Doubse Edwards – backing vocals (5)
 Jackie Johnson – backing vocals (5, 11)
 Susan Marshall – backing vocals (5, 11)
 Darrel Petties and Strength In Praise – choir (5, 12)

Production 
 Scott Hardin – producer (1, 2, 3, 8, 10), mixing
 James Joseph – producer (1, 2, 3, 7, 8, 10)
 Curry Weber – producer (1, 2, 3, 7, 8, 10), co-producer (5, 6, 11), engineer, mix assistant
 Todd Agnew – producer (2-6, 9, 10, 11, 12)
 Adam Hill – additional engineer
 Melissa Mattey - vocal engineer (1), piano engineer (9)
 Kevin Nix – mastering
 Larry Nix – mastering
 Mellowtown – layout
 Ben Pearson – photography

Chart positions

References

2009 albums
Todd Agnew albums
Ardent Records albums
INO Records albums